The 13th government of Turkey (9 July 1942 – 9 March 1943) was a government in the history of Turkey. It is also called first Saracoğlu government.

Background 
The government was formed after the previous prime minister Refik Saydam died. Şükrü Saracoğlu of Republican People's Party (CHP), who was a minister in Saydam’s cabinet, was appointed as the new prime minister.

The government
In the list below, the cabinet members who served only a part of the cabinet's lifespan are shown in the column "Notes".

Aftermath
The government ended because of the general elections held on 28 February 1943.

References

Cabinets of Turkey
Republican People's Party (Turkey) politicians
1942 establishments in Turkey
1943 disestablishments in Turkey
Cabinets established in 1942
Cabinets disestablished in 1943
Members of the 13th government of Turkey
6th parliament of Turkey
Republican People's Party (Turkey)